The 1953 NFL season was the 34th regular season of the National Football League. The names of the American and National conferences were changed to the Eastern and Western conferences.

Meanwhile, a Baltimore, Maryland, group headed by Carroll Rosenbloom was granted an NFL team, and was awarded the holdings of the defunct Dallas Texans organization, who can trace their lineage to the Dayton Triangles, founded in 1913, thus sending Rosenbloom a franchise with a tenuous connection to being the final remaining Ohio League member. The new team was named the Baltimore Colts, after the unrelated previous team that folded after the  season, and kept the blue and white color scheme of the Triangles-Texans franchise. The 12 teams of this NFL season continued for the rest of the 1950s; these teams became known as "old-line" teams as they predated the 1960 launch of the American Football League. 

The 1953 season ended on December 27 with the NFL championship game; the Detroit Lions defeated the Cleveland Browns for the second year in a row.

Draft
The 1953 NFL Draft was held on January 22, 1953, at Bellevue-Stratford Hotel in Philadelphia. With the first pick, the San Francisco 49ers selected defensive end Harry Babcock from Georgia.

Major rule changes
The definition of illegal motion is clarified. A player must be moving directly forward at the snap to be considered illegally in motion.

Conference races
For 1953, the former American and National Conferences of the previous three seasons were renamed the Eastern and Western Conferences, respectively.  The Western race saw the Rams beat the Lions twice, in Detroit (October 18) and in L.A. (November 1), and at the midway point in Week Six, the Rams were a full game ahead in the race.  In Week Seven (November 8), the 49ers beat the Rams 31–27, and the Lions won their game, to put all three teams at 5–2–0.  In Week Eight, the Lions beat Green Bay 14–7, while the Rams were tied 24–24 by the Cards, and the 49ers lost 23–21 to the Browns.  As both teams won their remaining games, San Francisco was always a game behind Detroit.

In the Eastern, the Cleveland Browns won their first eleven games and led wire-to-wire, clinching a playoff spot by week 10.  Their shot at a 12–0–0 regular season was spoiled by a 42–27 loss in the finale on December 13, and tarnished further by the championship game loss to the Lions two weeks later.

Final standings

NFL Championship Game

Detroit 17, Cleveland 16 at Briggs Stadium in Detroit, on December 27, 1953

League leaders

Awards
 UPI NFL Most Valuable Player – Otto Graham, Cleveland Browns

Coaching changes

Offseason
Baltimore Colts: The new Colts team hired Keith Molesworth as their first head coach.
Chicago Cardinals: Joe Kuharich was replaced by Joe Stydahar.

In-season
Green Bay Packers: Gene Ronzani resigned after 10 games. Hugh Devore and Ray McLean served as co-head coaches for the rest of the season.

Stadium changes
 The new Baltimore Colts move into Memorial Stadium, the home of the previous Colts team.
 The Green Bay Packers home games in Milwaukee moved from Marquette Stadium to Milwaukee County Stadium.
  Shibe Park, the home of the Philadelphia Eagles, was renamed Connie Mack Stadium.

References
 NFL Record and Fact Book
 NFL History 1951–1960 (Last accessed December 4, 2005)
 Total Football: The Official Encyclopedia of the National Football League

 
National Football League seasons